The Rape of Persephone is a myth in Greek mythology. This myth serves as the origin myth of seasons in Greek mythology.

Myth 
The myth of the abduction of Persephone exists in several versions in different sources. It is already briefly mentioned in the Theogony (verse 914) written by Hesiod around 700 BC. One of the earliest textual testimonies, a choral song in the Helena of Euripides (412 BC) names the Mountain Mother from the Ida Mountains as the mother of the kidnapped girl. In the fourth century after the birth of Christ, Claudius Claudianus , an epic in three books.

First, the probably oldest, almost complete story, namely the Homeric hymn 2 To Demeter, is to be reproduced and then the most important version for the aftermath and art history of modern times, namely that of the Roman version poet Ovid.

Homeric Hymns

Background 
Hades, god of the underworld and brother of Zeus, falls in love with Kore. He therefore asks Zeus for Kore as his wife. Knowing that Kore would not willingly go to the sunless underworld, Zeus neither agrees nor refuses. Hades interprets this as approval.

Robbery 
At this point the Homeric hymn begins. He draws an idyll that is abruptly interrupted:
 Far from Demeter, the mistress of the harvest, who cuts with a golden sickle, she played and plucked flowers with the daughters of Okeanos, roses, crocuses and beautiful violets, irises, hyacinths and daffodils. The earth produced the Narcissus as a wonderful trap for the beautiful girl of Zeus' plan to please Hades, who receives all. She was a wondrous sight to all, immortal gods and mortal men, and from her roots grew a hundred little heads, emitting such a sweet fragrance that all the wide heavens above and all the earth laughed, and the salty tide of the sea. The girl was charmed and stretched out both hands to grasp the splendor. But when she did, the earth opened up and the ruler Hades we will all meet burst forth with his immortal horses on the plane of Nysa. Lord Hades, son of Kronos, called by many names. Begging for mercy, she was dragged into the golden chariot.

Demeter's Quest 
No one heard Kores' screams except Helios, the sun god who is never deterred by events on earth, and Hekate in her cave.
Finally, however, Kore's distress also reached the mother's ear, who immediately set out to look for her daughter, but could not find her.
For nine days she wandered the earth, taking neither ambrosia nor nectar, for nine nights she searched for a trace of her daughter, a torch in her hands.
Finally, on the tenth day, she met Hekate, who also carried a torch, and told her about the kidnapping, but could not name the kidnapper.

Thereupon Demeter and Hecate, both holding flaming torches, climbed up to the palace of Helios, who, in response to her insistent pleas, told Demeter that Hades had stolen his daughter. But she shouldn't worry too much about it, he's a god, her brother and ruler over a third of the world.

Demeter in Eleusis 
Demeter, however, was horrified at the robbery and far from calming down.
She wanted nothing more to do with the gods and left Olympus, changing her form into that of an old woman and wandering among the people who did not recognize her. So she came to Eleusis to the Fountain of the Virgin, where she settled under an olive tree. To this well came the daughters of king Keleos of Eleusis: Callidice, Kleisidike, Demo and Kallithhoe. They ask the supposed old woman where she comes from and why she is so far from home. Demeter replied that her name was Doso, that she was from Crete and that she had been kidnapped by pirates but eventually escaped.

Thereupon the daughters of Keleos invited Demeter to their father's house, where they were kindly received by his wife Metaneira. But the goddess was silent and sorrowful, refusing to eat or drink, until the servant Iambe made her smile by loose jokes. She declined the offered wine, but asked for kykeon as a drink instead.
The goddess then took over the care of Demophon, the late-born son of Keleos and Metaneira.
She anointed the boy with ambrosia, which made him thrive and look more like a god than a man, but one night when she held him in the fire to make him immortal, she was surprised by Metaneira, who cried out loud, because she thought a mad old nurse wanted to burn her son.

As a result, the goddess was very angry and tore the boy out of the fire, leaving him doomed to death. Then she showed herself in her true form and demanded that a temple be built for her in Eleusis, which was done. When Demeter finally instituted the Mysteries of Eleusis, Keleos became the first of the high priests.

Kore's return 
Before that, however, she let her anger and despair run free: she ordered the plants to stop sprouting, and soon all the land was deserted, so that there was a danger that all people would die of hunger and the gods would remain alone in Olympus, without the clouds of sacrificial smoke that have so far been so pleasant to them.
Zeus therefore sent Hermes to Hades to release Kore for the general good of the gods.

Hades seemed reluctantly to bow to the will of Zeus, but before she mounted the chariot of Hermes, forced Persephone to give some pomegranate seeds as food.
When Kore returned to Demeter, the mother asked her if she hadn't eaten in the underworld, to which Kore confessed that Hades forced her to eat some pomegranate seeds.
Since that happened and nobody who has tasted the food of the dead can stay in the upper world permanently, Persephone had to live four months in the underworld with Hades, the remaining eight months she was allowed to spend on earth with her mother.' 
Demeter finally came to terms with this arrangement and agreed to restore the fertility of the earth.
She descended to earth, where she sprout the first grain in the field of Rharos near Eleusis and instituted the Eleusinian Mysteries.
The four months in the underworld represent the barren time on earth, Demeter is sad and therefore no plants bloom, but when her daughter is with her everything blooms and flourishes.

Metamorphoses 

Ovid treated the subject of the rape of Proserpine twice, namely in his most famous work, the Metamorphoses, and in the Fasti.

Robbery 
The Metamorphoses begin with a somewhat different account: in the Gigantomachy, the Giant Typhon was buried under Sicily, where he still fights restlessly against his gang and makes the earth tremble. Pluto in the underworld fears for himself and his kingdom and above all that the earth could burst and the sun could shine into his shadowy realm. Fearful Hades has tradition. In the Theogony of Hesiod it says that Hades remained trembling in the underworld while his brother Zeus bravely fought a battle with Typhon and finally defeated him. To calm himself, Pluto mounts his chariot drawn by four black horses to inspect the foundations of Sicily.

On this journey, Venus, enthroned high on the mountains in the company of Cupid, notices him. She believes that since no part of the world should be spared from Cupid's arrows, the underworld should now also feel its share of the power of love. And besides, the still virgin Proserpina is already a thorn in her side. Minerva and Diana had already conspired against virginity and evaded its power, she couldn't take it any longer if it spread. Cupid should immediately shoot his arrow at Pluto, who was frowning at the foundations of the island.

The kidnapping takes place at Ovid on the lake Pergusa near Enna in Sicily:
With deep tide lies near the walls of henna,
called Pergus, a lake. More songs of swans than this one
Do not listen even in the current of gliding waves Caystros.
All around the shore, forest crowns the waters and wards them off
Phoebus' glowing stitch with the foliage, as with a protective curtain.
The branches bring coolness, and the meadow nourishes Tyrian flowers.
Constant spring reigns. …
Pluto, struck by Cupid's arrow, sees Proserpina playing with her companions and picking flowers, falls in love, seizes her and rushes away - "such is the haste of sudden love"

The nymph Cyane had the courage to oppose Hades, but he opened the earth and drove down to the underworld with the chariot and the struggling bride.
Cyane was so heartbroken at her failure that she literally burst into tears and was transformed into the Ciane Fountain.

Quest of Ceres 
With Ovid, too, Ceres set out to look for the lost daughter. She, too, carries torches in her nocturnal search, of course it is now whole spruce trunks that she lights on Mount Etna. When she was thirsty in her restless search and is kindly received by Misme, an old woman, who gives her kykeon to drink, which she drains in one gulp, she is mocked by Askalabos, who mocks her greedy drinking. As punishment, Ceres transforms him into a star lizard.

When Ceres had searched the whole world in search of her daughter, she came back to Sicily and finally to the source of the cyane. She could have told her what had happened to Proserpina, but in her transformed state she had neither tongue nor lips. So she let Persephone's lost belt float on the surface of the water. Now, when Ceres saw the belt, she realized what had happened. The belt of a woman is generally regarded as a symbol of virginity, with the Romans it was particularly so. At Roman weddings, the belt was tied with a special knot, the Nodus Herculaneus, which the groom had to untie on the wedding night before the bride and groom could first be united.

Ceres was desperate now. She cursed the area and the whole world, deprived the earth of fertility, spoiled all seeds and killed cattle and farmers all at once. In the face of this unrestrained will to annihilate, the nymph Arethusa rises from her source, who knew of Proserpina's whereabouts through her far-reaching subterranean connections. She asked Ceres to spare the innocent earth and told her that her daughter was now queen among the dead. Ceres, now not only in despair but also extremely indignant, stepped before Jupiter and demanded the return of her daughter. He agreed on the condition that Proserpina had not eaten any food down in Hades.

Proserpina's return 
Ceres goes to get the daughter, but that shouldn't be. Proserpina, while strolling in a garden in the underworld, saw a pomegranate tree and tasted its fruit, only seven seeds. No one had seen it except Ascalaphus, a creature of the underworld who, as punishment of Proserpina, was transformed into an owl by dousing him with the water of Phlegeton.

But Proserpina's companions are also transformed: After they had searched every country in the world for her, they finally wanted to carry their longing calls for the stolen playmate across the seas and were therefore transformed by the gods into the feathered sirens, which only the human head distinguishes from the birds of the sea.

Eventually everyone comes to terms with it: Proserpina must remain in the underworld for six months and is with her mother for six months.

In Ovid's story, there follows the transformation of Arethusa and then the myth of Triptolemus, which is also related to the mysteries of Eleusis.

Fasti

Ceres in Sicily 
Ovid treats the abduction of Proserpina again in the Fasti (4,417-620), a Roman holiday calendar in the form of poems, and there under the date of April 12, the day on which the Ludi Cereris begin in the Roman festival calendar, the games in honor of Ceres.

Ovid reins in his poetic imagination here, so his narrative is somewhat more conventional:

Arethusa has invited the matrons to Sicily for the holy celebration, and Ceres also comes, accompanied by Proserpina, who meanwhile is enjoying herself in a meadow picking flowers. Then her uncle Pluto sees her and robs her. When her companions notice that Proserpina has disappeared, they burst into loud lamentations. Ceres hears this when she comes to Enna and immediately goes in search of her daughter, following her trail but then losing her. Ovid lists the stations of the search:
 Leontini, on the east coast 50 km north of Syracuse, rumored home of the man-eating Laistrygones,
 the river Amenanus, later Amenas, a small river that once flowed from Leontini to Catania,
 flowing into the river Akis, near present-day Acireale,
 the springs of Ciane, about 7 km southwest of Syracuse city center, and
 the source of the Anapus, into which Ciane flows, which rises on the Monte Lauro at Palazzolo Acreide,
 Gelas, a river that emptied at Gela on the south coast,
 Ortygia, a small island in front of Syracuse and its historical center,
 Megara Hyblaea, an ancient city 10 km south of Augusta,
 Pantagias, which empties into the Bay of Megara Hyblaea,
 the mouth of the Symaithos, a river at Hybla Major,
 the caves of the Cyclops, possibly sea caves at the foot of Mount Etna,
 the place named after the curved sickle - either Messina, formerly called Zancle (from Greek , "pruning knife", "sickle") or Drepanum (from Greek , "sickle"),
 Himera, an ancient city on the north coast between Panormus (today Palermo) and Cephaloedium (modern Cefalù),
 Dydime, today's Salina, one of the Aeolian Islands,
 ancient Akragas, south of present-day Agrigento,
 Tauromenium, today's Taormina,
 Mylae, today Milazzo,
 Camerina, 16 km southwest of Vittoria on the south coast,
 Thapsos, on the Magnisi peninsula at Priolo Gargallo, 18 km northeast of Syracuse,
 the canyon-like headwaters of the Helorus, today's Tellaro, and
 the Eryx, a mountain near the northwestern cape of Sicily.
At last it is said that she searched all of Sicily, from all three ends, naming the three points of Sicily, beginning with that nearest her last stop
 Pelorias, today Punta del Faro, the cape in north-eastern Sicily – here Strabon locates the sirens,
 Lilybaeum, present-day Marsala, the cape to the northwest, and
 Pachynum, today Capo Passero, the cape at the southeastern tip of Sicily.

Finally, Ceres is back on Etna and lights two spruces as torches at its fiery gorge, Typhon's mouth, whereby Ovid expressly points out that this is why the initiates of the Eleusinian Mysteries carry torches at the initiation. There is a cave, a rough chasm, alien to people and animals, abominations, there Ceres takes two snakes, harnesses them to her chariot and drives through the air to Attica.

Ceres in Eleusis: Triptolemus 
There she settles, sitting on a stone, the saddest stone - or the stone of sorrow, there she remains, sitting for days, unmoved by rain or moon, but the land on which the stone lies belongs to an old man, of Celeus. He has collected forest fruits, acorns and blackberries and bushes for fire and on the way home he passes the place where Ceres sits sadly on her stone in the form of an old woman, her hair hidden under a hood. The old man's daughter, who is driving two goats home, asks Ceres what is the matter with her, and the old man asks her to rest under his roof, but Ceres refuses, wishing the old man to always enjoy his children. but she was inconsolable, because her daughter had been stolen from her. Gods cannot weep, but their pain is so great that a crystal drop is squeezed out of their eye. The old man and his daughter, moved with pity, now shed tears, and the old man asks Ceres again not to despise his humble hut.

Ceres agrees and gets up. On the way, the old man tells her that his little son Triptolemos is very ill and cannot sleep because the pain is too much tormenting him. Then Demeter plucks some opium poppy, tastes it and thus breaks her fast, which is why those seeking initiation in Eleusis also break their fast in the same way. When they arrive at Celeus' hut, everyone is in mourning because no one believes in the boy's salvation. But when the goddess pityingly kisses him, he comes back to life and heals visibly.
They sit down to eat: There is quark in whey with apples and honey, but Ceres doesn't want to eat anything and only gives the boy poppy seeds in warm milk to drink.

Later, in the middle of the night, she takes him on her lap, casts three secret spells over him, and then covers him with embers from the hearth to burn away all mortal life and make him immortal. Then Metaneira wakes up, raises a scream and rips the child out of the embers. Then the goddess says:
You have sinned unexpectedly: Fear of mother turns away the gift and the boy remains doomed to death, but first he will till and sow and reap.
Then she mounts the dragon chariot, rises into the air and flies over Greece and along the borders of the world, which was then u. a. along the Rhine and Rhone, continues to search for her daughter, but always in vain.

She ascends to the circumpolar stars and is referred by them to the all-seeing sun. She then receives the well-known information from Helios. Here, too, Jupiter finally allows the return, provided Proserpina has eaten nothing in the underworld, but the Mercurius who was sent thereupon reports that she has eaten three pomegranate seeds. Then Ceres falls in mourning and would have descended to her daughter in the underworld forever, had Jupiter not admitted that Proserpina spends half the year in the upper world.

Location of rape 
The location of the kidnapping varies with the version of the myth, but not just casually. In some cases, the location of the event, namely the location of the robbery, is given special importance.

In the Homeric hymn, the location is the plain of Nysa, an otherwise unknown place. There is Mount Nysa as the birthplace of Dionysus and the Nysaic nymphs as caretakers of the Dionysus child and Nysa as Dionysus' wet nurse; but where the Nysa plain might be located is uncertain.

Cicero names the Sicilian henna; follow him Diodor and Ovid. Hyginus names Sicily.

See also 

 Demeter
 Hades
 Persephone

References 

 
Origin myths
Persephone
Sexuality in ancient Greece
Deeds of Zeus
Deeds of Demeter
Helios in mythology
Deeds of Gaia